The Men's keirin competition at the 2020 UCI Track Cycling World Championships was held on 27 February 2020.

Results

First round
The first round was started at 14:30. The first two riders in each heat qualified for the quarterfinals, all other riders moved to the repechages.

Heat 1

Heat 3

Heat 5

Heat 2

Heat 4

First round repechage
The first round repechage was started at 15:40. The first two riders in each heat qualified for the quarterfinals.

Heat 1

Heat 3

Heat 2

Heat 4

Quarterfinals
The quarterfinals were started at 16:36. The first four riders in each heat qualified for the semifinals.

Heat 1

Heat 3

Heat 2

Semifinals
The semifinals were started at 19:14. The first three riders in each heat qualified for the final, all other riders raced for places 7 to 12.

Heat 1

Heat 2

Finals
The finals were started at 20:42.

Small final

Final

References

Men's keirin
UCI Track Cycling World Championships – Men's keirin